Mylochromis melanotaenia is a species of cichlid endemic to Lake Malawi where it is believed to occur only in the southern portion of the lake.  It prefers sandy substrates with patches of Vallisneria.  This species can reach a length of  TL.  This species can also be found in the aquarium trade.

References

melanotaenia
Fish described in 1922
Taxonomy articles created by Polbot